Joshua Randolph Jackson (born April 3, 1996) is an American football cornerback for the Arizona Cardinals of the National Football League (NFL). He played college football at Iowa, and was drafted by the Green Bay Packers in the second round of the 2018 NFL Draft.

Early years
Jackson attended Lake Dallas High School in Corinth, Texas, where he played high school football as a cornerback and wide receiver. He committed to the University of Iowa to play college football.

College career
After redshirting his first year at Iowa in 2014, Jackson played in all 14 games in 2015, recording eight tackles. In 2016, he played in 12 games and made one start and recorded 10 tackles. As a first year starter his junior year in 2017, Jackson was named Big Ten Defensive Back of the Year and a finalist for the Jim Thorpe Award. On January 3, 2018, Jackson declared his intentions to enter the 2018 NFL Draft.

College statistics

Professional career

Green Bay Packers
The Green Bay Packers selected Jackson in the second round (45th overall) of the 2018 NFL Draft. Jackson was the fourth cornerback drafted in 2018 and was the second selected by the Packers after Jaire Alexander (18th overall). 

On May 17, 2018, the Green Bay Packers signed Jackson to a four-year, $6.25 million contract that includes $3.87 million guaranteed and a signing bonus of $2.62 million.

Throughout training camp, Jackson competed to be a starting cornerback against Kevin King, Jaire Alexander, Tramon Williams, and Davon House. Head coach Mike McCarthy named Jackson the fifth cornerback on the depth chart to begin the regular season, behind Tramon Williams, Kevin King, Jaire Alexander, and Davon House.

He made his professional regular season debut and first career start in the Green Bay Packers’ season-opener against the Chicago Bears and made three solo tackles during their 24–23 victory. On September 16, 2018, Jackson recorded four solo tackles and scored the first touchdown of his career during a 29–29 tie against the Minnesota Vikings in Week 2. Jackson recovered a punt by Matt Wile and caught it in the endzone for a touchdown after it was blocked by Geronimo Allison during the first quarter. On November 25, 2018, Jackson collected a season-high eight combined tackles during a 24–17 loss at the Minnesota Vikings in Week 12. On December 2, 2018, the Green Bay Packers fired head coach Mike McCarthy after they fell to a 4–7–1 record. He finished his rookie season in 2018 with 48 combined tackles (39 solo) and ten pass deflections in 16 games and ten starts.

Jackson largely served as a depth role for the Packers, receiving playing time when primary starter Kevin King was injured. He received criticism for his preseason performance ahead of the 2021 season.

New York Giants
On August 17, 2021, Jackson was traded to the New York Giants for cornerback Isaac Yiadom. He was waived on October 26, 2021, without having played in a regular season game for the Giants.

Kansas City Chiefs
Jackson signed with the Kansas City Chiefs practice squad on October 29, 2021. He was released on January 18, 2022.

Arizona Cardinals
Jackson signed with the Arizona Cardinals on June 16, 2022. He was released on August 29.

Pittsburgh Steelers
On September 5, 2022, Jackson was signed to the Pittsburgh Steelers practice squad. On October 15, 2022, Jackson was promoted to the active roster. He was released on December 24, 2022.

Arizona Cardinals (second stint)
On December 26, 2022, Jackson was claimed off waivers by the Arizona Cardinals.

NFL career statistics

Regular season

References

External links

New York Giants bio
Iowa Hawkeyes bio

1996 births
Living people
Players of American football from Houston
All-American college football players
American football cornerbacks
Arizona Cardinals players
Green Bay Packers players
Iowa Hawkeyes football players
Kansas City Chiefs players
New York Giants players
Pittsburgh Steelers players